Edgewood is a historic home located at Stanleytown, Henry County, Virginia. It was built about 1830, and consists of a projecting two-story, three bay, pedimented, Greek-temple-form central mass and two-story flanking wings, in the Greek Revival style. The house features three semi-integral end chimneys, and a one-story front porch.

It was listed on the National Register of Historic Places in 2007.

References

Houses on the National Register of Historic Places in Virginia
Greek Revival houses in Virginia
Houses completed in 1830
Houses in Henry County, Virginia
National Register of Historic Places in Henry County, Virginia
1830 establishments in Virginia